Benton Castle is a small fortification in the community of Burton, Pembrokeshire, Wales, now in use as a private house, in a wooded area overlooking the Cleddau river.

History
The castle was probably built in the 13th century, one of a number of castles protecting the boundaries of the ancient Hundred of Rhos. Its origins are obscure, but in the 14th century it was held by Thomas de Roche, Lord of Llangwm.
A 1583 map of Pembrokeshire shows the castle on the west bank of the Eastern Cleddau (Clethy), and George Owen mentions it in 1603. The waterway was busy until recent times.

The castle is said to have been held and damaged in the Civil War with some, including Benton, more or less destroyed.  

Richard Fenton, in his 1811 Historical Tour, says:

Lewis's Topographical Dictionary of 1844 says:

In 1888, Edward Laws describes the castle as one of a chain protecting south Pembrokeshire, especially Milford Haven, from invasion in the 12th and 13th centuries:

Renovation
The ruins were stabilised in the early 20th century, and it remained uninhabited until 1930, after which date it was renovated. The courtyard was roofed by 1954, and the building was sold in the 1960s and further restored. The castle is whitewashed and has been Grade II* listed "for its historic interest and rarity as a restored small medieval castle".

References

External links

Historical links and sources on GENUKI

Castles in Pembrokeshire
Grade II* listed buildings in Pembrokeshire